Lead(II) oxalate is an organic compound with the formula PbC2O4. It is naturally found as a heavy white solid.

Preparation
This compound is commercially available. It may be prepared by the metathesis reaction between lead(II) nitrate and sodium oxalate:

Pb2+(aq) + C2O42− → PbC2O4 (s)

Solubility
Lead(II) oxalate is insoluble in water. Its solubility is increased in presence of excess oxalate anions, due to the formation of the Pb(C2O4)22− complex ion.

References

Lead(II) compounds
Oxalates